William Robinson Pattangall (June 29, 1865 – October 21, 1942) was an American politician from Maine. He was particularly known for his support of public schools and opposition to the Ku Klux Klan. He was later the Chief Justice of the Maine Supreme Judicial Court retiring on July 16, 1935.

Early political career
He was born on June 29, 1865 in Pembroke, Maine, a coastal town in Washington County. Pattangall married Jean M. Johnson in 1884 and later Gertrude Helen McKenzie (1874–1950) in 1892.  Pattangall was elected as both a Republican and Democrat. He became Mayor of Waterville, a member of the Maine House of Representatives (1897–1898; 1901-1902; 1909–1912), and then Maine's Attorney General (1911–1913). Pattangall was a supporter of Woodrow Wilson and a proponent of civil rights.

As a state legislator, Pattangall fought for a provision from 1909 to 1911 doubling the amount of state tax money dedicated to Maine schools.  Passed in 1911, the law was then brought before the Maine Supreme Judicial Court as unconstitutional.  Pattangall, now Attorney General, argued in its favor and prevailed.

Opposition to the Ku Klux Klan

Pattangall was the Democratic candidate for Governor of Maine in 1922 and 1924 but lost both times.  The second race was against Republican Owen Brewster, who was supported by the Ku Klux Klan.  Pattangall made Brewster's Klan support the centerpiece of the campaign.  Although this was not a winning strategy, it helped set the stage for a split within the Maine Republican Party around the issue of Klan support, resulting in the election of anti-Klan (and anti-Brewster) Republican Senator Arthur R. Gould in 1926.

Pattangall also fought the Klan element in his own party.  As a delegate to the Democratic National Convention of 1924, in New York, he proposed inserting an anti-Klan plank into the party platform, despite the presence of an estimated 300 Klansmen in the hall.  The attempt caused the "hissing and booing of Klansmen along with fist fights, chair tossing, and destruction of convention decorations".  Opposed by William Jennings Bryan and other party leaders, the plank was voted down, and with it the potential presidential candidacy of Catholic Al Smith.  Smith's supporters would be more successful at the subsequent Democratic convention, however, by which time the Klan had seriously weakened as a political force.

Pattangall was a gifted and entertaining orator, well known for his caustic wit.  This is exemplified in his volume "Meddybemps Letters" that included a "Hall of Fame" with bitterly satiric biographies of the leading Republicans of the time. Pattangall was never elected to national office, however, due to what he characterized as "Democratic treachery."

Judgeship and Defection to the Republican Party
Pattangall was appointed Associate Justice of the Maine Supreme Judicial Court (by the Republican administration) in 1926, but only broke with his party over President Franklin Roosevelt's New Deal, to which he became bitterly opposed.  He ultimately joined the Republican Party and soon after was appointed Chief Justice (1930–35). He died on October 21, 1942 in Augusta, Maine.

External links
 The Supreme Judicial Court of the State of Maine, 1820 to 2009

References

 

1865 births
1942 deaths
Maine Democrats
Maine lawyers
Maine Republicans
People from Pembroke, Maine
Mayors of Waterville, Maine
Maine Attorneys General
Justices of the Maine Supreme Judicial Court
Chief Justices of the Maine Supreme Judicial Court
Members of the Maine House of Representatives
American newspaper editors
Editors of Maine newspapers